Saint Enravota or Voin (Воин, "warrior") or Boyan (Боян) was the eldest son of Omurtag of Bulgaria and the first Bulgarian Christian martyr, as well as the earliest Bulgarian saint to be canonized.

Born in the early 9th century, Enravota was the elder brother of Malamir of Bulgaria, who succeeded their father Omurtag to the Bulgarian throne in 831. Enravota was possibly deprived of the throne because he favoured Christianity, which the boyars feared might endanger the court. Not long after the death of Omurtag, Enravota asked his brother to release a pious Byzantine captive who had been imprisoned by Omurtag. The captive's sermons persuaded Enravota to convert to Christianity and be baptized.

Once informed of his brother's deeds, Malamir attempted to make him renounce Christianity, but did not succeed. Enravota was killed on the order of Malamir, around 833. 11th-century chronicler Theophylact of Bulgaria claimed he delivered the following prophetic speech before his death:

In the Bulgarian Orthodox Church, Enravota's feast day is 28 March.

Honours
Enravota Glacier on Nordenskjöld Coast in Graham Land, Antarctica is named after St. Enravota.

References
 
 

9th-century births
9th-century Bulgarian people
830s deaths
Bulgarian princes
9th-century Christian saints
9th-century Christian martyrs
Medieval Bulgarian saints